Ali Jawdat al-Ayoubi (Arabic: علي جودت الأيوبي; November 11, 1886 – March 3, 1969) was Prime Minister of Iraq from 1934–1935, 1949–1950, and in the latter half of 1957. His father was of Kurdish origin and his mother of Arab origin.

Ali Jawdat Al-Ayoubi was born in Mosul in 1886 while Iraq was under Ottoman rule. His father descendant of Saladin. His father served as a police sergeant, and upon retirement owned a grocery store.  At a young age, Ali was dispatched by his parents from the town of Beaji where they lived, on a ten-day boat trip to Baghdad,  where he stayed in the care of an aunt and attended the Rashidiyeh military school. Upon graduation, he went by camel and ship to Istanbul where he attended the Military College with other Iraqis, including Jaafar al-Askari, Nuri al-Said, Jamil al-Midfai and Yasin al-Hashimi. With these latter, he fought during the First World War throughout the Arab lands for independence from Ottoman rule. Upon establishment in 1921 of the Kingdom of Iraq, with King Feisal the First as its ruler, each served in turn in positions of leadership. Ali Jawdat served as Military Governor for Aleppo and Homs, during the short-lived tenure of the first Arab Kingdom of Syria, under King Faisal, and thereafter served in turn as Governor of Hilla, Nejef, Kerbela, Mosul, Diyala, and Basra and variously as Minister of Finance, Minister of the Interior, Foreign Minister and Iraqi Ambassador to France and Washington, where he established the first Iraqi embassy in the US.  He served three times as Prime Minister (1934, 1949 and 1957), successively under King Faisal the First, King Ghazi the First and King Faisal the Second. He was the president of the Chamber of Deputies from March 1935 to August 1935.

The name “Jawdat” was given to him by his teachers and colleagues, and it means “quality” in Arabic.  An ardent Arab nationalist, he espoused an inclusionary, non-sectarian vision of Iraq, encompassing its various ethnicities, sects and tribes.  He strove to achieve greater autonomy from the influence of Great Britain, as embodied principally in the acquiescent behavior of the Regent, Abdul Ilah and occasionally of his friend Nuri Al Said, and once resigned as Minister of Finance in Nuri Pasha's cabinet in protest at a treaty of cooperation with Great Britain to which Nuri agreed.

The Iraqi monarchy, represented by King Faisal II, was toppled in the 14 July Revolution led by Abdel Karim Qasim, driven by months of intensive radio propaganda by Egyptian President Nasser's Voice of the Arabs.  Ali Jawdat survived this coup, but Nuri al-Said and other leaders did not.

While Military Governor of Aleppo and Homs in 1919, he met and married Nazik Tahseen, and they had three children, Nizar, Selwa and Nameer.  Ali Jawdat lived simply and modestly, and was recognized for his integrity, courage and dedication to Arab nationalism.  He died in Beirut on March 3, 1969, shortly after completing his memoire.

References

1886 births
1969 deaths
Arabs from the Ottoman Empire
Prime Ministers of Iraq
Presidents of the Chamber of Deputies of Iraq
People from Mosul
Finance ministers of Iraq
Government ministers of Iraq
Ambassadors of Iraq to the United Kingdom
Ambassadors of Iraq to the United States
Ambassadors of Iraq to France
Iraqi Arab nationalists